The 1927 Milan–San Remo was the 20th edition of the Milan–San Remo. The winner was Pietro Chesi (Italy).

External links

Milan–San Remo
Milan-San Remo, 2009
Milan-San Remo
Milan-San Remo